China Muerta National Reserve is a national reserve of Chile. It was created on June 28, 1968 by Supreme Decree No. 330 of the Ministry of Agriculture.

References

National reserves of Chile
Protected areas of La Araucanía Region